The 2018–19 EHF Champions League was the 59th edition of Europe's premier club handball tournament and the 26th edition under the current EHF Champions League format.

RK Vardar defeated Telekom Veszprém 27–24 in the final to win their second title.

Competition format
Twenty-eight teams, divided into four groups, participated in the competition. Groups A and B were played with eight teams each, in a round robin, home and away format. The top team in each group qualified directly for the quarter-finals, while the bottom two in each group dropped out of the competition. The remaining 10 teams qualified for the first knockout phase.

In Groups C and D, six teams played in each group in a round robin format, with both home and away games. The top two teams in each group then met in an elimination play-off, with the two winners proceeding to the first knockout phase. The remaining teams were eliminated from the competition.

Knockout Phase 1 (Last 16)

12 teams played home and away in the first knockout phase, with the 10 teams qualified from Groups A and B and the two teams qualified from Groups C and D.

Knockout Phase 2 (Quarter-finals)

The six winners of the matches in the first knockout phase were joined by the winners of Groups A and B to play home and away for the right to contest the VELUX EHF FINAL4.

VELUX EHF FINAL4

The culmination of the season, the VELUX EHF FINAL4, continued in its existing format, with the four top teams from the competition competing for the title over one weekend in LANXESS arena, Cologne.

Team allocation
28 teams were directly qualified for the group stage.

Round and draw dates

Group stage

The draw for the group stage was held on 29 June 2018 at 12:30 at the Erste Campus in Vienna, Austria. The 28 teams were drawn into four groups, two containing eight teams (Groups A and B) and two containing six teams (Groups C and D). The only restriction was that teams from the same national association could not face each other in the same group. The only exception was HBC Nantes, who play against one of the two French rivals in the group.

In each group, teams will play against each other in a double round-robin format, with home and away matches.

After completion of the group stage matches, the teams advancing to the knockout stage will be determined in the following manner:

Groups A and B – the top team will qualify directly for the quarterfinals, and the five teams ranked 2nd–6th will advance to the first knockout round.
Groups C and D – the top two teams from both groups contest a playoff to determine the last two sides joining the 10 teams from Groups A and B in the first knockout round.

Group A

Group B

Group C

Group D

Playoffs

Knockout stage

The first-placed team from the preliminary groups A and B advanced to the quarterfinals, while the 2–6th placed teams advanced to the round of 16 alongside the playoff winners.

Round of 16

Quarterfinals

Final four

Final

Statistics and awards

Top goalscorers

Awards
The all-star team was announced on 31 May 2019.

Goalkeeper:  Dejan Milosavljev
Right wing:  Ivan Čupić
Right back:  Dainis Krištopāns
Centre back:  Kentin Mahé
Left back:  Mikkel Hansen
Left wing:  Timur Dibirov
Pivot:  Julen Aguinagalde

Other awards
MVP of the Final four:  Igor Karačić
Best Defender:  Blaž Blagotinšek
Best Young player:  Ludovic Fabregas
Coach:  Roberto García Parrondo

References

External links
Official website

 
2018
2018 in handball
2019 in handball
2018 in European sport
2019 in European sport